The rolling stock preserved on the North Yorkshire Moors Railway is used to operate trains on the North Yorkshire Moors Railway (NYMR), a heritage railway in North Yorkshire, England. There is a variety of preserved steam and diesel locomotives and diesel multiple units, passenger coaches and goods wagons. Some are owned by the railway itself but most are owned by various individuals or voluntary groups. The line is also regularly visited by locomotives based elsewhere. Some come for a day on a railtour, others for a few days or weeks to take part in a special gala, but a few stay for many months and form part of the stock working scheduled trains.

Notes
 Some mainline certified/non mainline certified locomotives are not permitted to run on the line to  due to various technical reasons, which may include: high axle weight exceeding the bridges maximum load on this route; the route's curves are too tight and may damage the locomotives driving wheels, etc.
 Certified for full mainline use on the National Network besides the Whitby to Battersby sections.
 Loco not permitted to operate over the mainline due to flange less centre driving wheels and route curves being too tight which could cause a derailment.

Steam locomotives

Operational

Locomotives undergoing light repairs are noted down.

1 = Mainline Certified (Grosmont-Whitby/Battersby Only)
2 = Mainline Certified (Fully Certified)
3 = Not Permitted to operate on mainline

Visiting Engines

Under overhaul/repairs/restoration

Stored/On display

Diesel locomotives and shunters

Operational

Under overhaul

Stored

Past members of the NYMR fleet

Steam
 Hudswell Clark 0-4-0ST No. 1 Mirvale, ex-Mirvale Chemicals, Mirfield. (First steam locomotive to arrive at NYMR) Now at Middleton Railway, Leeds.
 E Borrows 0-4-0WT No. 3, ex-Wallsend Slipway. Now at Flour Mill works, Forest of Dean.
 Sentinel 4wVBTG Teesside No. 5, ex-British Steel. Now part of National Collection, on loan to Hull Streetlife Museum. Currently named Frank Galbraith.
 Robert Stephenson and Hawthorn 0-4-0ST No. 15 Eustace Forth, ex-Central Electricity Generating Board. Built in 1942. Formerly part of National Collection, now based at the Foxfield Railway.
 Andrew Barclay 0-6-0ST No. 2 Salmon, ex-Stewart's and Lloyd's. Built in 1942. Now at Royal Deeside Railway.
 Hudswell Clarke 0-6-0T No. 20 Jennifer, ex-NCB. Built in 1942. Now managed by Llangollen Railway but on loan to Wensleydale Railway.
 Robert Stephenson and Hawthorn 0-6-0T No. 7607931 Meteor, ex-NCB. Built in 1950. Now at East Somerset Railway.
 Robert Stephenson and Hawthorn 0-6-0ST No. 47 Moorbarrow, ex-NCB. Built in 1955. Now at Gwili Railway.
 Robert Stephenson and Hawthorn 0-6-0ST No. 62 ex-Stewart's and Lloyd's. Built in 1950. Now at Spa Valley Railway. Currently named Ugly.
 Hunslet Engine Co. Austerity 0-6-0ST No. S115 Antwerp, ex-NCB. Now at Sellindge, Kent.
 GWR Class 56XX 0-6-2T No. 6619. Built in 1928. Now at Kent and East Sussex Railway.
 SR Rebuilt West Country Class 4-6-2 No. 34010 Sidmouth. Now at Southern Locomotives, Herston.
 SR Rebuilt West Country Class 4-6-2 No. 34027 Taw Valley. Now at Severn Valley Railway.
 LMS Class 5MT 4-6-0 No. 44767 George Stephenson. Now at Carnforth Motive Power Depot, Lancashire 
 Great Northern Railway Class J13 (LNER J52) 0-6-0ST No. 1247. Now at National Railway Museum, York.
 North Eastern Railway Class T3 (LNER Q7) 0-8-0 No. 901. Now at Darlington North Road Station Museum.
 LNER Class A2 4-6-2 No. 60532 Blue Peter. Now at LNWR, Crewe.
 LNER Class A4 4-6-2 No. 60007 Sir Nigel Gresley. Now based at Crewe Works but will still regularly visit the NYMR.
 LNER Class B1 4-6-0 No. 61264. Now based at Nottingham Heritage Railway and undergoing overhaul. Will still operate on the mainline.
 LNER Class J72 0-6-0T No. 69023 Joem. Now at Hopetown Works, Darlington.
 BR Standard Class 4MT 4-6-0 No. 75014. Built in 1951. Now at Dartmouth Steam Railway.
 BR Standard Class 9F 2-10-0 No. 92214. Renamed Leicester City, this is now at Great Central Railway.
 Ministry of Supply Class WD/Hellenic State Railways Class Λβ 2-10-0 No. 90775. Now at North Norfolk Railway.
 United States Army Transportation Corps Class S160 2-8-0 No. 2253. Following overhaul at Adam Dalgleish Engineering in Stockton-on-Tees, the engine returned to the NYMR in late 2018 for completion and running in. Will soon depart again for a five-year period on hire to the Dartmouth Steam Railway.
 GWR 2884 Class 2-8-0 No. 3814 Left NYMR for Llangollen for restoration to continue.

Carriages 
The NYMR is home to many historic carriages from vintage Hull and Barnsley stock to London and North Eastern teak carriages. The British Railways carriages and younger carriages are usually mainline certified.

Pre-grouping Carriages

References

Rolling stock
North Yorkshire Moors Railway
North Yorkshire Moors Railway